This is the discography of Dir En Grey, a Japanese heavy metal band. They have recorded eleven original studio albums, three EPs and thirty one singles in their twenty four years together. Each of the band's releases has charted on Japan's Oricon charts.

Dir En Grey made their earliest releases as an independent band with Free-Will, eventually signing a temporary deal with Warner Music Japan. Dir En Grey's earliest releases were self-produced, however, they worked with a producer, X Japan drummer Yoshiki Hayashi, for a series of five singles preceding Gauze.

With the release of Macabre, Dir En Grey began to release cooperatively between Firewall Division, a subsidiary of Free-Will, and Sony Music Entertainment Japan. In 2005, Dir En Grey signed to the Europe label, Gan-Shin. The following year, they would release in the United States under Warcon Enterprises and Fontana Distribution, while being managed by Free-Will's American branch.  On both foreign labels, the band's initial release was Withering to Death, and followed by The Marrow of a Bone. Their seventh album Uroboros is planned for both a European (Gan-Shin) and American release (The End Records).

Dir En Grey have made only one release on their independent label, Free-Will, since the major label debut; they released their music video compilation, Average Psycho through the independent label due to graphic content, not allowed by Sony.

Albums

Extended plays

Singles

Compilations 
 Behind the Mask, Volume 2 (November 25, 1997)
 Kai, (Remix Album) (August 22, 2001)
 The Best of Taste of Chaos (January 24, 2006)
 The Family Values Tour 2006 CD (December 26, 2006)
 Decade 1998–2002 (December 19, 2007)
 Decade 2003–2007 (December 19, 2007)
 Romantist - The Stalin, Michiro Endo Tribute Album (December 9, 2010)
 Vestige of Scratches  (January 2, 2018)

Music videos 
 Kaede ~If Trans...~ (January 15, 1998)
 Mōsō Tōkakugeki (妄想統覚劇, October 7, 1998)
 Gauze -62045- (November 17, 1999)
 Kimon (鬼門, March 20, 2002)
 Average Fury (June 29, 2005)
 Average Psycho (July 27, 2005)
 Average Blasphemy (October 27, 2009)
 Average Sorrow (April 1, 2015)
 Average Psycho 2 (September 2, 2015)
 Average Psycho 3 (March 30, 2022)

Live videos 
 Mōsō Kakugaigeki (妄想格外劇, October 7, 1998)
 1999.12.18 Ōsaka-jō Hall (February 16, 2000)
 Tour 00⏩01 Macabre (July 25, 2001)
 Rettō Gekishin Angya Final 2003 5 Ugly Kingdom (May 21, 2003)
 Blitz 5 Days (March 3, 2004)
 Tour 04 The Code of Vulgar[ism] (November 6, 2004)
 Tour 05 It Withers and Withers (May 8, 2006)
 The Family Values Tour 2006 DVD (December 26, 2006)
 Despair in the Womb (February, 2007)
 In Weal or Woe (February 10, 2008)
 A Knot Of (February 2, 2009)
 Tour 08 The Rose Trims Again (April 28, 2009)
 Tour 09 Feast of V Senses (September, 2009)
 Uroboros -With the Proof in the Name of Living...- At Nippon Budokan (May 26, 2010)
 Tour 2011 Age Quod Agis Vol.1 (Europe & Japan) (June 20, 2012)
 Tour 2011 Age Quod Agis Vol.2 (U.S. & Japan) (July 18, 2012)
 Tour 12-13 In Situ-Tabula Rasa (September 25, 2013)
 Tour13 Ghoul (April 23, 2014)
 Dum Spiro Spero At Nippon Budokan (July 16, 2014)
 Tour14 Psychonnect -Mode Of “Gauze?”- (September 2014)
 Arche At Nippon Budokan (June 2016)
 Tour16-17 From Depression To  [Mode Of Vulgar] (March 2017)
 Tour16-17 From Depression To  [Mode Of Dum Spiro Spero] (March 2017)
 Tour16-17 From Depression To  [Mode Of Kisō] (March 2017)
 Tour16-17 From Depression To  [Mode Of Uroboros] (September 2017)
 Tour16-17 From Depression To  [Mode Of The Marrow Of A Bone] (September 2017)
 Tour16-17 From Depression To  [Mode Of Macabre] (July 2018)
 Tour16-17 From Depression To  [Mode Of Withering To Death.] (July 2018)
 Documentary Of Tour16-17 From Depression To  (July 2018)
 From Depression To  [Mode Of 16-17] (August 2019)
 The Final Days of Studio Coast (September 2022)

Album scores
 Gauze (October 24, 1999)
 Macabre (February 1, 2001)
 Kisou [鬼葬] (2002)
 Six Ugly (January 31, 2005)
 Vulgar (January 31, 2005)
 Withering to Death (January 15, 2010)
 The Marrow of a Bone (January 15, 2010)
 Uroboros (September 5, 2011)
 Dum Spiro Spero (February 25, 2013)

Photo books
 Dir En Grey Yarouze (1999)
 Shikaku [A Dead Angle] (2000)
 Dragon Fly (2002)
 [xx] A Pilgrimage Capsizing the Islands 2002 Asia - The Japanese Fxxker Family (2002)
 Ware (我, 2002)
 UV Special: Dir En Grey The Manipulated Life (2005)
 Dir En Grey Yarouze Special (2006)
 Shankara (2008)
 Ouroboros (2010)
 Amon (2011)
 The Unwavering Fact of Tomorrow Tour 2010-2011 (2011)
 Overseas Documentary Greed (2012)
 Minerva -Rinkaku- (2012)
 Minerva -The Unraveling- (2013)
 Dir En Grey Players Book (2016)
 2019120520220127 (2022)

References 

Dir En Grey
Heavy metal group discographies
Discographies of Japanese artists